is a passenger railway station located in the city of Komatsushima, Tokushima Prefecture, Japan. It is operated by JR Shikoku and has the station number "M05".

Lines
Only local trains stop at the station.

Layout
The station consists of an island platform serving two tracks. A passing loop runs to the side of track 1 in between the platform and the station building. The station building is unstaffed and serves only as a waiting room. Access to the island platform is by means of a level crossing and ramp.

To the south of the station, the Komatsushima Line once branched off towards the railway facilities at Komatshima Port. At 1.9 km, the Komatsushima Line was the shortest line in the network of Japanese National Railways (JNR). The line was closed in 1985. The old Komatsushima Station and its environs has now been turned into a park where the station building and several steam locomotives are on display.

Platforms

Adjacent stations

History

The Awa Steamship company was nationalized on 1 September 1917, and Japanese Government Railways (JGR) took over control of the station and operated it as part of the Komatsushima Light Railway and later, the Komatsushima Line. On 1 July 1936, the Anan Railway was nationalized and became part of the Mugi Line. Chūden now became the starting point of the Komatsushima Line. On 14 March 1985, the Komatsushima Line was closed and Chūden was then served only by the Mugi Line.

On 1 April 1987, with the privatization of Japanese National Railways (JNR), the successor of JGR, JR Shikoku took over control of the station.

Passenger statistics
In fiscal 2019, the station was used by an average of 888 passengers daily

Surrounding area
Komatsushima City Chiyo Elementary School
 Tokushima Prefectural Komatsushima Nishi High School

See also
 List of Railway Stations in Japan

References

External links

 JR Shikoku timetable

Railway stations in Tokushima Prefecture
Railway stations in Japan opened in 1916
Komatsushima, Tokushima